"Witchcraft" is the seventh single released by the American synthpop band Book of Love. The song was the third, and final single from the band's second album Lullaby, and was released on July 15, 1989.

"Witchcraft" was the only single from the album Lullaby that failed to make the Billboard charts. The track samples the classic 60s TV series Bewitched, and also chants the names of the witches/characters from the show..."Enchantra, Endora, Tabitha, Esmerelda, Clara, Hagatha". The song features quirky deadpan rap-style vocals from Susan Ottaviano, Jade Lee, and Lauren Roselli, with a Shakespeare-inspired incanting of ingredients for brewing a love potion. Remixes on the 12" single include samples from the track "Let's All Chant" by Michael Zager Band.

The B-side "Enchantra" is a completely different composition, aside from the fact that it uses the chant of Bewitched character names from "Witchcraft".

The cover art of the 12" was done by band members Lauren Roselli and Jade Lee. It consists of a picture of a Play-Doh "queen" (done by Lauren Roselli), with refrigerator magnet lettering of the band's name and song title. Female names included as part of the back cover artwork (Enchantra, Hagatha, Clara, Endora, and Esmeralda) come from the song's chorus.  The witches named in the song's chorus are all named as a part of the back cover art except Tabitha. The cover sleeve was featured in the 2011 book Put The Needle On The Record by Matthew Chojnacki, which celebrated the vinyl sleeves of records from the 1980s.

During the band's Lullaby Tour in 1989, when performing "Witchcraft", the band donned witches' hats, making it a fan favorite of the band's live shows.

"Enchantra" has been used as the intro track while the band takes to the stage during Book of Love's 2013 shows.

Track listings

1989 12" maxi-single (Sire Records 9 21251-0)
Side A:
"Witchcraft" (Extended Mix) - 5:15
"Witchcraft" (7" Mix) - 3:16
"Enchantra" - 2:44
Side B:
"Witchcraft" (Enchantra Chanting) - 6:23
"Witchcraft" (Dub) - 5:20
"Witch's Honor" - 0:05 (not listed on the sleeve)

Personnel 
"Witchcraft" written by Theodore Ottaviano. "Enchantra" written by Jade Lee and Ted Ottaviano. All instruments arranged, programmed, and performed by Book of Love.

 Susan Ottaviano - Lead vocals
 Ted Ottaviano - Keyboards
 Lauren Roselli - Keyboards, backing vocals
 Jade Lee - Keyboards, Percussion, backing vocals

12" sleeve credits
 Produced by Flood and Ted Ottaviano
 Remix and additional production by Book of Love
 Engineered by Doc Dougherty
 Edited by Roger Pauletta
 Mastered at Sterling Sound
 Play-Doh queen by Lauren Roselli
 Art direction by Jade Lee

Side A dead wax says: "Miss Lucy’s in Heaven 4-26-89"

Charts 

"—" denotes that song failed to chart

Official versions

" * " denotes that version is available as digital download

References

External links 
 

Book of Love (band) songs
1989 singles
1988 songs
Sire Records singles
Song recordings produced by Flood (producer)